Relative is a 2022 American drama/comedy feature film written and directed by Michael Glover Smith. The film is about a family reunion centered on a college graduation party in Chicago. It premiered at the 2022 Gasparilla International Film Festival in Tampa, Florida where actor Cameron Scott Roberts won the Grand Jury award for Best Performance.

Plot 
Karen Frank and her husband, David, are retirement-age progressive activists who have lived in the same Victorian home in Chicago’s Rogers Park neighborhood for 30 years. It’s the house in which their four children grew up and where two of their children, adult sons Benji and Rod, still live. On the eve of Benji’s graduation from college, daughters Evonne and Norma return home from out-of-state for a weekend celebration. Evonne brings her daughter, Emma, and newly separated wife, Lucia; Norma arrives alone, with thoughts of wasted potential as she reconsiders her suburban life; Rod, an unemployed burnout, pines for Sarah, the “cam girl” ex who left him years ago; and all Benji wants to do is escape the party to rendezvous with Hekla, a free-spirited actress he met the night prior. As David and Karen announce the potential sale of their home, each member of the Frank family finds their bonds with the others being tested – and strengthened – in surprising ways.

Background and production 
It was announced in 2021 that the film was being produced by Newcity/Chicago Film Project and would star Twin Peaks''' Wendy Robie and Steppenwolf Theater Ensemble member Francis Guinan.

In an interview with Split-Tooth Media, Smith said, "[A]ll of my films are really about love, which is the only subject that interests me". He noted that the inspiration for Relative was to stretch himself as a writer/director by examining, for the first time, familial relationships, which he claimed "are a lot more complicated than the ones you have with a friend or a romantic partner". Smith also cited, as influences, films such as Arnaud Desplechin's A Christmas Tale, Yasujirō Ozu's Late Spring and John Ford's How Green Was My Valley.Relative was shot over a span of two weeks in the summer of 2021 in Chicago and the near-north suburbs.

 Cast 

 Wendy Robie as Karen Frank
 Francis Guinan as David Frank
 Cameron Scott Roberts as Benji Frank
 Clare Cooney as Evonne Frank
 Keith D. Gallagher as Rod Frank
 Emily Lape as Norma Frank
 Melissa DuPrey as Lucia Aguirre
 Elizabeth Stam as Hekla

 Release 
The film received a limited theatrical release beginning on June 8, 2022. It was the 23rd highest grossing movie in the U.S. during its first week in release.

 Reception Relative has received very positive reviews for its writing, acting, and directing. This includes a three-and-a-half (out of four) star review by the Chicago Sun-Times' Richard Roeper who called it "a wickedly funny, occasionally poignant and authentic-to-its-core drama/comedy about three eventful days in the life of a totally relatable extended family", a three (out of four) star review by RogerEbert.com's Matt Zoller Seitz who compared it to the work of British filmmaker Mike Leigh, and a 7.5/10 star review by Ray Lobo at Film Threat. Matt Fagerholm, writing at Indie Outlook, called it "one of the year's best films". 

 Awards 

 External links 

 Relative at IMDb
 Relative at Letterboxd 
 Official trailer on YouTube
 Classic Chicago Magazine'' interview with Smith

References 

2020s English-language films
2022 comedy films
2022 drama films
2022 films
2022 LGBT-related films
American comedy films
American drama films
American LGBT-related films
American romantic comedy-drama films
Films set in Chicago
Films shot in Chicago
Lesbian-related films
LGBT-related romantic comedy-drama films
2020s American films